Chen Chih-peng (born 15 January 1981 in Taiwan) is a former Taiwanese baseball player who played for the Brother Elephants of the Chinese Professional Baseball League (CPBL) as an outfielder. He was with the Macoto Cobras and dmedia T-REX before playing for the Elephants. At the end of 2008, dmedia T-REX was disbanded and he was picked up by the Elephants in the fourth round of the redistribution draft. His older brother, Chen Chih-yuan (陳致遠), plays as a left fielder on the same team.

Career statistics

See also
 Chinese Professional Baseball League
 Macoto Cobras
 dmedia T-REX
 Brother Elephants

References

External links
 Taiwan baseball

1981 births
Living people
Baseball outfielders
Baseball players from Taoyuan City
Brother Elephants players
Macoto Cobras players
Taiwanese baseball players